Sugriva is a King In the ancient Indian epic Ramayana. He is the younger brother of Vali, whom he succeeded as ruler of the vanara kingdom of Kishkindha. Rumā is his wife. He is a son of Surya, the Hindu deity of the sun. As the king of the vanaras, Sugriva aided Rama in his quest to liberate his wife Sita from captivity at the hands of the rakshasa king Ravana.

Nomenclature 

Legend

The story of Sugriva is part of Ramayana and in an abbreviated version, is also present in the Mahabharata.

The king of Kishkindha, Vrikshraja, was a divine creature born from Brahma's tilaka. He had the body of a human and face and tail of a monkey. He was instructed to roam the forests and kill demons. One day, Vriksharaja entered an enchanted pond, and was transformed into a beautiful lady, attracting the attention of both Indra and Surya. Soon after, they each sired Vali and Sugriva respectively. Vali and Sugriva were born having brute strength, equal to Indra and Surya.

Quarrel between brothers 

Vali ruled the kingdom of Kishkindha; his subjects were the vanaras. Tara is his wife. Angada is his son. His son left his house at a very young age and later became a follower of Vaishnavism. A raging demon by the name of Mayavi came to the gates of the capital and challenged Vali to a fight. Vali accepted the challenge, but when he sallied forth, the demon fled in terror into a deep cave. Vali entered the cave in pursuit of the demon, telling Sugriva to wait outside. When Vali did not return and upon hearing demonic shouts in the cave and seeing blood streaming from its mouth, Sugriva concluded that his brother had been slain. With a heavy heart, Sugriva rolled a boulder to seal the cave's opening, returned to Kishkindha, and assumed kingship over the vanaras, taking his brother's wife Tara as his queen. Vali, however, ultimately prevailed in his combat with the demon and returned home. Seeing Sugriva acting as king, he concluded that his brother had betrayed him. Though Sugriva humbly attempted to explain himself, Vali would not listen. As a result, Sugriva is exiled from the kingdom. To exact his vengeance, Vali forcibly took Sugriva's wife Ruma for his own, and the brothers became bitter enemies. Sugriva went on to live upon the mountain Rishyamukh,  the only place on earth that Vali could not tread on. The king had been previously cursed by Sage Mathanga to be unable to lay a foot on this mountain on pain of death.

Sugriva makes an alliance

In exile, Sugriva made the acquaintance of Rama, the avatar of Vishnu, who is on a quest to rescue his wife Sita from the demon Ravana, king of the rakshasas. Rama promised Sugriva that he would kill Vali and would reinstate Sugriva as the king of the vanaras. Sugriva, in turn, promised to help Rama with his quest.

The Death of Bali

Together, Sugriva and Rama went to seek out Vali. While Rama stood back, Sugriva shouted a challenge and dared him to battle. The brothers rushed at each other, fighting with trees and stones, with fists, nails, and teeth. They were evenly matched and indistinguishable to the observer, until Sugriva's counsellor Hanuman, stepped forward and placed a garland of flowers around Sugriva's neck. It is then that Rama emerged with his bow and drove an arrow through Vali's heart. After Vali's death, Sugriva reclaimed the vanara kingdom, took back his first wife, Ruma, and also reclaimed Vali's primary wife, Tara, who became his queen. Her son by Vali, Angada, became the crown prince.

Duel with Lava and Kusha 
On Lakshmana's request and after Guru Vasistha's approval, Rama plans to do Ashvamedha yajna. At this auspicious occasion he calls Sugriva along with Angada, Nala, Nila, Jambavantha and Hanuman to come to Ayodhya. Rama greets and hugs Sugriva, Jambavantha and others on their arrival to Ayodhya.

The yajna horse is captured by Lava and Kusha brothers. In the Rama's army the news spreads that two muni kumara's has captured the Yagya's horse. Shatrughana walks and fights with Lava and he is defeated by Lava. Then Lakshamana comes and he is also defeated by Lava. Then Bharata asks Rama to give him the permission to go to set horse free from both muni Kumara. Sugriva and Hanuman also request Rama to permit them to go along with Bharata in the battle. Lava and Kusha defeat Bharata and Sugriva and took Hanuman as a prisoner. Hanuman is the only one who knew that Lava and Kusha were sons of his master Rama & Sita and thus allowed himself to be imprisoned by his master's sons.

Retirement 
When Rama decided to depart from the world and took samadhi in the Sarayu river, Sugriva also retired from earth and went with his father Surya. He crowned his nephew Angada as the next king of Kishkindha.

Jainism

According to Jain texts, Sugriva is a human being and he took Jain Diksha and attained Moksha from Mangi-Tungi.

Depictions

 The combat of Sugriva with his brother Vali is a favorite motif of the Khmer sculptors contributing to the Angkorian temples and monuments near Siem Reap in Cambodia.
 A detailed and moving tympanum at the 10th century Hindu temple of Banteay Srei depicts the combat of the brothers, as well as Rama's intervention and Vali's death in the arms of another vanara.
 A bas-relief at the 12th-century temple of Angkor Wat shows the fight between the brothers, arrival of Rama and Vali lying on his death-bed, mourned by many other vanaras.  Another scene shows Sugriva and Rama entering into their alliance. A large bas-relief depicts the Battle of Lanka between Rama and Sugriva's army of vanaras and Ravana's army of Rakshasas.
 The fight between Vali and Sugriva is also represented at the lesser-known 13th century Angkorian temple of Preah Pithu.

References

Further reading
Anna Dhallapiccola, Dictionary of Hindu Lore and Legend.
 Valmiki Ramayana, Ramayana written by Maharshi Valmiki.

External links

 The Ramayana of Valmiki, online version, English translation by Ralph T. H. Griffith.
 The Mahabharata of Vyasa, online version, English translation by Kisari Mohan Ganguli.
 Photos of the tympanum at Banteay Srei in Cambodia depicting Sugriva's combat with Vali and Rama's intervention.

Vanara in the Ramayana
Animals in religion
Characters in the Ramayana